Renate Schneider (born 3 May 1939) is a retired German gymnast. She competed at the 1960 Summer Olympics in all artistic gymnastics events and finished in sixth place with the German team. Individually her best achievement was 36th place on the uneven bars. In 1956 she won a national title on the vault.

References

1939 births
Living people
German female artistic gymnasts
Gymnasts at the 1960 Summer Olympics
Olympic gymnasts of the United Team of Germany
Gymnasts from Berlin